American Mining Congress v. Mine Safety & Health Administration, 995 F.2d 1106 (1993) is a decision by the United States Court of Appeals for the District of Columbia Circuit concerning the issues of administrative law and agency oversight.

Overview
In this case, a miners' organizations petitioned for review of Program Policy Letters (PPL) of Mine Safety and Health Administration, stating agency's position that certain x-ray readings qualified as diagnoses of lung disease within meaning of agency reporting regulations.

Holding
The Court was called upon to determine whether the PPL on the issue of x-rays was an interpretive rule, in which case it would be valid, or a legislative rule, in which case it would be invalid (for not being enacted in accordance with the Administrative Procedure Act). The Court used a four-part test to determine whether the rule was legislative (an affirmative answer to any one means the rule is legislative): 
 Whether in the absence of the rule there would not be an adequate legislative basis for enforcement action or other agency action to confer benefits or ensure the performance of duties; 
 Whether the agency has published the rule in the code of federal regulations; 
 Whether the agency has explicitly invoked its general legislative authority; 
 Whether the rule effectively amends a prior legislative rule. Subsequent caselaw has minimized the importance of the second factor.

References

External links
 
 Case Brief for use in an Administrative Law Class

Mine safety